The Gooseville Mill/Grist Mill is a historic mill on the North Branch Milwaukee River in Gooseville, Wisconsin. The mill was built in 1879 to replace an 1855 mill that had burned down. The mill is a small custom mill with board and batten siding and is typical of the custom mills common in Sheboygan County in the 1800s. A Lefel turbine powered the mill, replacing the paddle wheel used in the 1855 mill. A burr mill was used to grind the grain processed at the mill. As of 1984, the mill was still operational and occasionally used as a sawmill.

The mill was added to the National Register of Historic Places in 1984.

References

Grinding mills on the National Register of Historic Places in Wisconsin
Industrial buildings completed in 1879
Buildings and structures in Sheboygan County, Wisconsin
Grinding mills in Wisconsin
National Register of Historic Places in Sheboygan County, Wisconsin
1879 establishments in Wisconsin